Uthali Union is a union parishad situated at Jibannagar Upazila,  in Chuadanga District, Khulna Division of Bangladesh. There are 19 villages and 15 mouzas in the union.

References

External links
 

Unions of Khulna Division
Unions of Chuadanga District
Unions of Jibannagar Upazila